This is a list of regions of the State of Palestine by Human Development Index as of 2021.

Trends by UNDP reports (international HDI) 
Human Development Index (by UN Method) of Palestinian Governorates since 2004.

See also 
 Demographics of Palestine
 Economy of Palestine
 Education in Palestine
 Health in Palestine

References 

Human Development Index
Palestine
Palestine